The Solvik Formation is a geologic formation in the central Oslo Region of Norway. It preserves fossils dating back to the early Silurian period.

Fossil content

See also

 List of fossiliferous stratigraphic units in Norway

References

 

Geologic formations of Norway
Silurian System of Europe
Silurian Norway
Silurian southern paleotemperate deposits